Gaoyou North railway station is a railway station in Jieshou, Gaoyou, Yangzhou, Jiangsu, China. It opened with the remaining section of the Lianyungang–Zhenjiang high-speed railway on 11 December 2020. During construction, this station was called Jieshou (界首).

References

Railway stations in Jiangsu
Railway stations in China opened in 2020